River Edge is a borough in Bergen County, in the U.S. state of New Jersey. As of the 2020 United States census, the borough's population was 12,049, an increase of 709 (+6.3%) from the 2010 census count of 11,340, which in turn reflected an increase of 394 (+3.6%) from the 10,946 counted at the 2000 census.

The community was originally incorporated as the borough of Riverside by an act of the New Jersey Legislature on June 30, 1894, from portions of Midland Township, based on the results of a referendum held the previous day. On December 1, 1930, the borough's name was changed to River Edge. The borough was formed during the "Boroughitis" phenomenon then sweeping through Bergen County, in which 26 boroughs were formed in the county in 1894 alone. The borough was named for its location along the Hackensack River.

Geography
According to the United States Census Bureau, the borough had a total area of 1.88 square miles (4.86 km2), including 1.83 square miles (4.75 km2) of land and 0.05 square miles (0.12 km2) of water (2.39%).

Cherry Hill and North Hackensack are unincorporated communities located within River Edge.

The borough is bordered by the Bergen County municipalities of Hackensack, New Milford, Oradell, Paramus and Teaneck.

Demographics

2010 census

The Census Bureau's 2006–2010 American Community Survey showed that (in 2010 inflation-adjusted dollars) median household income was $97,816 (with a margin of error of +/− $7,136) and the median family income was $109,335 (+/− $12,278). Males had a median income of $71,219 (+/− $6,936) versus $63,305 (+/− $12,071) for females. The per capita income for the borough was $38,772 (+/− $2,392). About 3.0% of families and 4.2% of the population were below the poverty line, including 5.0% of those under age 18 and 4.2% of those age 65 or over.

Same-sex couples headed 19 households in 2010, a decrease from the 24 counted in 2000.

2000 census
As of the 2000 United States census there were 10,946 people, 4,165 households, and 3,102 families residing in the borough. The population density was 5,804.5 people per square mile (2,236.1/km2). There were 4,210 housing units at an average density of 2,232.5 per square mile (860.0/km2). The racial makeup of the borough was 84.12% White, 1.06% African American, 0.08% American Indian, 12.60% Asian, 0.01% Pacific Islander, 0.81% from other races, and 1.32% from two or more races. Hispanic or Latino of any race were 5.31% of the population.

There were 4,165 households, out of which 35.0% had children under the age of 18 living with them, 64.4% were married couples living together, 7.6% had a female householder with no husband present, and 25.5% were non-families. 22.7% of all households were made up of individuals, and 11.5% had someone living alone who was 65 years of age or older. The average household size was 2.62 and the average family size was 3.11.

In the borough the population was spread out, with 24.1% under the age of 18, 5.0% from 18 to 24, 30.2% from 25 to 44, 23.8% from 45 to 64, and 17.0% who were 65 years of age or older. The median age was 40 years. For every 100 females, there were 90.9 males. For every 100 females age 18 and over, there were 86.7 males.

The median income for a household in the borough was $71,792, and the median income for a family was $80,422. Males had a median income of $62,044 versus $41,085 for females. The per capita income for the borough was $33,188. About 2.5% of families and 3.1% of the population were below the poverty line, including 3.5% of those under age 18 and 2.6% of those age 65 or over.

Government

Local government
River Edge is governed under the Borough form of New Jersey municipal government, which is used in 218 municipalities (of the 564) statewide, making it the most common form of government in New Jersey. The governing body is comprised of a Mayor and a Borough Council, with all positions elected at-large on a partisan basis as part of the November general election. A Mayor is elected directly by the voters to a four-year term of office. The Borough Council is comprised of six members elected to serve three-year terms on a staggered basis, with two seats coming up for election each year in a three-year cycle. The Borough form of government used by River Edge is a "weak mayor / strong council" government in which council members act as the legislative body with the mayor presiding at meetings and voting only in the event of a tie. The mayor can veto ordinances subject to an override by a two-thirds majority vote of the council. The mayor makes committee and liaison assignments for council members, and most appointments are made by the mayor with the advice and consent of the council.

, the Mayor of the Borough of River Edge is Democrat Thomas R. Papaleo, whose term of office ends December 31, 2023. The members of the Borough Council are Council President Michelle Kaufman (D, 2024), Barry Benson (D, 2025), Dario Chinigo (D, 2023), Indira Kinsella (D, 2023), Klodiana Malellari (D, 2024) and Lissa Montisano-Koen (D, 2025).

In January 2020, the Borough Council selected Indira Kinsella from three candidates nominated by the Democratic municipal committee to fill the seat expiring in December 2020 that had been held by Thomas Papaleo until he resigned to take office as mayor.

In February 2016, the Borough Council selected Mary Davis from a list of three candidates nominated by the Republican municipal committee to fill the seat expiring in December 2016 that was vacated by Edward Mignone when he took office as mayor.

In October 2015, council member Anthony Cappola resigned from office and left the race for an Assembly seat in the 38th Legislative District, following disclosures that he had written and published a 2003 book titled Outrageous that was described as "full of racial slurs, rants and stereotypes".

List of mayors

Federal, state and county representation
River Edge is located in the 5th Congressional District and is part of New Jersey's 38th state legislative district. Prior to the 2011 reapportionment following the 2010 Census, River Edge had been in the 39th state legislative district.

Politics

As of March 2011, there were a total of 6,776 registered voters in River Edge, of which 1,961 (28.9% vs. 31.7% countywide) were registered as Democrats, 1,329 (19.6% vs. 21.1%) were registered as Republicans and 3,485 (51.4% vs. 47.1%) were registered as Unaffiliated. There was one voter registered to another party. Among the borough's 2010 Census population, 59.8% (vs. 57.1% in Bergen County) were registered to vote, including 80.7% of those ages 18 and over (vs. 73.7% countywide).

In the 2016 presidential election, Democrat Hillary Clinton received 3,107 votes (55.3% vs. 54.2% countywide), ahead of Republican Donald Trump with 5,618 votes (40.5% vs. 41.1%) and other candidates with 235 votes (4.2% vs. 4.6%), among the 5,690 ballots cast by the borough's 7,477 registered voters, for a turnout of 76.1% (vs. 72.5% in Bergen County). In the 2012 presidential election, Democrat Barack Obama received 2,723 votes here (53.0% vs. 54.8% countywide), ahead of Republican Mitt Romney with 2,337 votes (45.5% vs. 43.5%) and other candidates with 58 votes (1.1% vs. 0.9%), among the 5,134 ballots cast by the borough's 7,065 registered voters, for a turnout of 72.7% (vs. 70.4% in Bergen County). In the 2008 presidential election, Democrat Barack Obama received 2,965 votes here (52.6% vs. 53.9% countywide), ahead of Republican John McCain with 2,577 votes (45.7% vs. 44.5%) and other candidates with 45 votes (0.8% vs. 0.8%), among the 5,633 ballots cast by the borough's 7,100 registered voters, for a turnout of 79.3% (vs. 76.8% in Bergen County). In the 2004 presidential election, Democrat John Kerry received 2,821 votes here (49.8% vs. 51.7% countywide), ahead of Republican George W. Bush with 2,790 votes (49.3% vs. 47.2%) and other candidates with 31 votes (0.5% vs. 0.7%), among the 5,661 ballots cast by the borough's 6,988 registered voters, for a turnout of 81.0% (vs. 76.9% in the whole county).

In the 2013 gubernatorial election, Republican Chris Christie received 58.3% of the vote (2,007 cast), ahead of Democrat Barbara Buono with 40.7% (1,400 votes), and other candidates with 1.0% (35 votes), among the 3,522 ballots cast by the borough's 6,801 registered voters (80 ballots were spoiled), for a turnout of 51.8%. In the 2009 gubernatorial election, Republican Chris Christie received 1,714 votes here (46.2% vs. 45.8% countywide), ahead of Democrat Jon Corzine with 1,702 votes (45.9% vs. 48.0%), Independent Chris Daggett with 230 votes (6.2% vs. 4.7%) and other candidates with 11 votes (0.3% vs. 0.5%), among the 3,707 ballots cast by the borough's 6,921 registered voters, yielding a 53.6% turnout (vs. 50.0% in the county).

Education
The River Edge Elementary School District served students in pre-kindergarten through sixth grade. As of the 2021–22 school year, the district, comprised of two schools, had an enrollment of 1,164 students and 96.0 classroom teachers (on an FTE basis), for a student–teacher ratio of 12.1:1. Schools in the district (with 2021–22 enrollment data from the National Center for Education Statistics) are 
New Bridge Center serving PreK-K, 
Cherry Hill School with 698 students in grades 1-6 on the south side of the borough and 
Roosevelt School with 472 students in grades 1-6 on the north side of the borough.

River Edge and neighboring Oradell share a combined public school district for seventh through twelfth grades, River Dell Regional School District which was established in 1958. As of the 2021–22 school year, the high school district, comprised of two schools, had an enrollment of 1,606 students and 140.2 classroom teachers (on an FTE basis), for a student–teacher ratio of 11.5:1. Schools in the district (with 2021–22 enrollment data from the National Center for Education Statistics) are 
River Dell Regional Middle School in River Edge (with 589 students in grades 7-8) and 
River Dell Regional High School in Oradell (with 999 students in grades 9-12). Seats on the regional school district's nine-member board of education are allocated based on the population of the constituent municipalities, with five seats assigned to River Edge.

Public school students from the borough, and all of Bergen County, are eligible to attend the secondary education programs offered by the Bergen County Technical Schools, which include the Bergen County Academies in Hackensack, and the Bergen Tech campus in Teterboro or Paramus. The district offers programs on a shared-time or full-time basis, with admission based on a selective application process and tuition covered by the student's home school district.

St. Peter Academy is a K–8 Catholic school that operates under the auspices of the Roman Catholic Archdiocese of Newark. The school was one of eight private schools recognized in 2017 as an Exemplary High Performing School by the National Blue Ribbon Schools Program of the United States Department of Education.

The Rosenbaum Yeshiva of North Jersey, which served 1,040 students in nursery through eighth grade as of the start of the September 2013 school year, was founded as the Yeshiva of Hudson County, and was re-established in Bergen County in 1979.

Transportation

Roads and highways

Route 4 is the primary highway serving River Edge, running along the borough's southern edge. County Route 503 (Kinderkamack Road) passes north-south through the borough, alongside the Hackensack River.

Public transportation
River Edge has two train stations in the borough, at River Edge (at River Edge Road on the north end of the borough) and New Bridge Landing (at Grand Avenue on the south end of the borough). These stations provide service on NJ Transit's Pascack Valley Line, which runs north–south to Hoboken Terminal with connections via the Secaucus Junction transfer station to New York Penn Station and to other NJ Transit rail service. Connections are available at Hoboken Terminal to other NJ Transit rail lines, Hudson-Bergen Light Rail, PATH trains, and NY Waterway ferry service to the World Financial Center and other destinations.

There are parking lots at both the River Edge and New Bridge Landing stations that are available for River Edge residents. Permits are required to use the lots and can be obtained from the borough.

NJ Transit offers bus service to and from the Port Authority Bus Terminal in Midtown Manhattan on the 165 route and local service on the 756 and 762 routes.

The 11T/11AT route of Rockland Coaches also serves the Port Authority Bus Terminal, as well as providing service to Rockland County, New York.

Points of interest
New Bridge Landing is the site of The Bridge That Saved A Nation crossed by the Continental Army and General Washington as they retreated from the British attack on New York City on November 20, 1776.
 Campbell-Christie House is a historic home constructed in April 1774 in what was then Hackensack Township on the east side of the Hackensack River that was moved in its entirety in 1977 from New Milford
 Steuben House was used by George Washington as his headquarters for 16 days in September 1780.
 Demarest House is a historic house near the Van Steuben and Campbell Christie house. It is known for its stove chimney which was a technological advance at the time it was built in 1794. It was originally in New Milford, but then moved to River Edge. It was renovated in 2009 and is open to the public as a museum.

Parks and recreation
Parks in River Edge include:
While the train ride, zoo, carousel, and pony rides are on the Paramus side of the park, the playground, dog park, baseball fields, some walking paths, and Walden Pond are on the River Edge side.
 Veterans Memorial Park – located on Continental Avenue that has a playground, a picnic area, a ball court/roller hockey rink, and a baseball field. 
 Brookside Park – located on Greenway Terrace that has a walking path, playground, and a basketball court.
 River Edge Bird Sanctuary and Nature Trail – located on the River Edge/Paramus border, this park has a bird sanctuary and a walking nature trail. It is located behind The Shoppes on IV shopping center in Paramus. 
 River Edge Arboretum – located on Elm Avenue next to the River Edge Public Library that has a walking path and tennis courts. 
 Cherry Blossom Park – located on Bogert Road next to Cherry Hill Elementary School.  It features a variety of flowers and plantings with a walking path and seating areas. 
 Kiddie Wonderland was a children's amusement park that operated from 1951 to 1958. It featured rides such as a train ride, carousel, and a small roller coaster. It was located at the end of Main Street where the Hackensack River intersects with Coles Brook. It was later converted into apartments.

Notable people

People who were born in, residents of, or otherwise closely associated with River Edge include:

 Reino Aarnio (1912–1988), architect
 Joanna Angel (born 1980), alternative pornographic and mainstream actress, director, and writer of adult films
 Robert O. Becker (1923–2008), orthopedic surgeon and researcher in electrophysiology/electromedicine who co-authored The Body Electric: Electromagnetism and the Foundation of Life
 Frank Capsouras (born 1947), weightlifter who represented the United States in the men's heavyweight event at the 1972 Summer Olympics
 Charley Casserly (born 1949), former General Manager of the Washington Redskins
 J. Walter Christie (1865–1944), tank pioneer
 John Donovan (born 1974), college football coach who has been the offensive coordinator for the Vanderbilt Commodores football program
 Paul J. Fishman (born 1957), United States Attorney for the District of New Jersey
 Louise Gonnerman (born 1947), former professional tennis player.
 Freddie Hoffman, bicyclist who has ridden more than one million miles on his bicycle
 Harry and Patricia Kislevitz, creators of Colorforms, the 'stick-on' vinyl shapes toy
 Lucile Lawrence (1907–2004), harpist
 Jack Lazorko (born 1956), former pitcher who played for the Milwaukee Brewers, Seattle Mariners, and the California Angels
 Mickey Mantle (1931–1995), former baseball player for the  New York Yankees, member of the National Baseball Hall of Fame
 Charles Mayo (1884–1977), English-American professional golfer
 Lee Meredith (born 1947), actress who played the role of Ulla in the 1968 screen version of The Producers
 Billy Paultz (born 1948), former ABA and NBA basketball player, nicknamed "The Whopper"
 Gene Roddenberry (1921–1991), television screenwriter, producer and creator of Star Trek: The Original Series
 Scot D. Ryersson (born 1960), illustrator, graphic artist and writer
 Teata Semiz (born 1934), bowler inducted into the Professional Bowlers Association Hall of Fame in 1991
 Ali Shayegan (1903–1981), opponent of Shah Mohammad Reza Pahlavi who lived in political exile in the United States from 1958
 Ellen Zavian (born 1963), sports agent and attorney who was the National Football League's first female attorney-agent

References

Sources 

 Municipal Incorporations of the State of New Jersey (according to Counties) prepared by the Division of Local Government, Department of the Treasury (New Jersey); December 1, 1958.
 Clayton, W. Woodford; and Nelson, William. History of Bergen and Passaic Counties, New Jersey, with Biographical Sketches of Many of its Pioneers and Prominent Men., Philadelphia: Everts and Peck, 1882.
 Harvey, Cornelius Burnham (ed.), Genealogical History of Hudson and Bergen Counties, New Jersey. New York: New Jersey Genealogical Publishing Co., 1900.
 Van Valen, James M. History of Bergen County, New Jersey. New York: New Jersey Publishing and Engraving Co., 1900.
 Westervelt, Frances A. (Frances Augusta), 1858–1942, History of Bergen County, New Jersey, 1630–1923, Lewis Historical Publishing Company, 1923.

External links

 Borough of River Edge official website
 Midbergen Communities website (unofficial)

 
1894 establishments in New Jersey
Borough form of New Jersey government
Boroughs in Bergen County, New Jersey
Populated places established in 1894
New Jersey populated places on the Hackensack River